Ark is an album by the original members of the Animals. Released in 1983 by I.R.S. Records, it peaked at #66 on the Billboard Top 200. Ark was the second and last reunion attempt of the band's initial lineup, and the album was subsequently followed by a tour by the band.

"The Night" was a moderate success in the US, reaching #48 on the Billboard Hot 100 and #34 on the Mainstream Rock Tracks. The single was followed by "Love Is for All Time". Both songs were written and recorded for an Eric Burdon solo album but held back once the reunion plans went further. A lot of the other songs were written by Burdon and his team. "No John No" was penned by Alan Price.

This album follows a recent trend of many veteran acts such as Fleetwood Mac, Stevie Nicks, Jackson Browne, Linda Ronstadt and Queen, where they either augmented their classic sound, or swapped it entirely, for a punk/new wave sound. The Animals were no exception with Ark displaying a prominent new wave/post-punk sound.

Track listing

Side one
 "Loose Change" (Steve Grant) (3:01)
 "Love Is for All Time" (Eric Burdon, Danny Everitt, Terry Wilson) (4:23)
 "My Favourite Enemy" (Steve Grant) (3:46)
 "Prisoner of the Light" (Eric Burdon, Jon Raskin, John Sterling) (4:09)
 "Being There" (T. Gemwells) (3:29)
 "Hard Times" (Eric Burdon, John Sterling) (2:55)

Side two
 "The Night" (Eric Burdon, John Sterling, Don Evans) (3:55)
 "Trying to Get You" (Rose Marie McCoy, Charlie Singleton)-(4:16)
 "Just Can't Get Enough" (Eric Burdon, John Sterling) (3:54)
 "Melt Down" (Danny Everitt, Terry Wilson) (3:08)
 "Gotta Get Back to You" (Danny Everitt, Terry Wilson) (2:42)
 "Crystal Nights" (M. Anthony, Eric Burdon, M. Lewis, John Sterling) (4:12)
 "No John No" (Alan Price) (4:18) (track on CD, but not on original album. B-side of "The Night")

With the exception of the CD bonus track, the songwriting credits shown above are as they appeared when the album was originally issued in 1983 (I.R.S. Records, SP-70037).  When the album was re-issued in 2002 on compact disc (Castle Records, 06076-81172-2), the songwriting credits for Everitt, Wilson and Gemwells were removed.  This left tracks 5, 10 and 11 ("Being There", "Melt Down" and "Gotta Get Back to You") with songwriting credits that simply read "Unidentified".  It also left Burdon as the only credited songwriter for track 2 ("Love Is for All Time").

When the album was re-issued on the Repertoire label in 2008 the songwriting credits for "Melt Down", "Gotta Get Back To You" and "Being There" were restored.

The album was again re-issued as a burn-on-demand title by Amazon using the CD as the source in 2014. The artwork eliminated the booklet in favor of the song titles only.

Personnel
The Animals
 Eric Burdon – vocals
 Hilton Valentine –  guitar
 Alan Price – keyboards, background vocals
 Chas Chandler –  bass, background vocals
 John Steel – drums
Additional personnel
 Zoot Money - keyboards
 Steve Grant – guitar, synthesizer, background vocals
 Steve Gregory – tenor saxophone, baritone saxophone
 Nippy Noya – percussion

Production
Production is credited to all five band members.  Co-production credit is given to Steve Lipson on tracks 2, 3, 4, 5, 7, 9, and 10.  Engineering credit is given to Lipson for those tracks on which he is credited as a co-producer, and to Nic Rudrum for the other tracks.<ref>Liner notes, I.R.S. Records SP-70037.  
Jim Newport - design
Eric Burdon - design concept
Paul S. Power - cover illustration

References

1983 albums
The Animals albums
Albums produced by Stephen Lipson
I.R.S. Records albums
Illegal Records albums
Epic Records albums
Repertoire Records albums
Castle Communications albums